The College de Bouéni is a secondary education, located in the town of Bouéni in Mayotte.

History 
The College of Bouéni is a secondary education located in the town of Bouéni in Mayotte, it is historically known as the first college built in the town, it has been more than 20 years that the inhabitants of the town of Bouéni have been waiting for this college, it is in 2017 that the Ministry of Overseas, Ericka Bareigts, lays the first stone of the future college of Bouéni.

The college will accommodate 1028 students including 128 Section of General education and  Vocational Adapted.

This establishment was built in an approach  bioclimatic.

References

See also 
 Education in France
 Secondary education

Buildings and structures in Mayotte
Education in Overseas France
Secondary schools in France
Schools in Africa